Radical 24 or radical ten meaning ten, complete, or perfect is one of 23 of the 214 Kangxi radicals that are composed of 2 strokes.

In the Kangxi Dictionary, there are 55 characters (out of 40,000) to be found under this radical.

 is also the 6th indexing component in the Table of Indexing Chinese Character Components predominantly adopted by Simplified Chinese dictionaries published in mainland China.

Evolution

 is two crossed lines. It was originally a vertical line, a pictogram of a needle (now /针), later supplemented by a dot in the center of the stroke which became a short cross-stroke and expanded to the current shape.

Derived characters

Literature 

Leyi Li: “Tracing the Roots of Chinese Characters: 500 Cases”. Beijing 1993, 
 KangXi: page 155, character 17
 Dai Kanwa Jiten: character 2695
 Dae Jaweon: page 348, character 6
 Hanyu Da Zidian: volume 1, page 58, character 9

See also
 Cross

External links

Unihan data for U+5341

024
006